Royal Daisy Airlines , was a private airline in Uganda. The airline is no longer in business.

Location
The airline maintains its headquarters in Kampala, the capital of Uganda and the largest city in that country. The airline's major operations base is at Entebbe International Airport, the largest civilian and military  airport in Uganda.

Overview
Royal Daisy operates regular scheduled flights from Entebbe, Uganda to Juba, South Sudan. The company operates a 30-seater twin engine Embraer 120 aircraft. One of three Uganda-based airlines to fly the route between Entebbe and Juba, Royal Daisy's business increased when Sudan Airways withdrew from the route in 2005. It was their success on the route between Juba and Entebbe, where they compete with Air Uganda and Eagle Air (Uganda), that led to the opening of the Kisumu route in May 2008. African Safari Airways operates a Royal Daisy charter on the route between Entebbe and Nairobi, Kenya.

History
The airline was formed on 30 November 2005.

Destinations
Royal Daisy Airlines flies from Entebbe to Juba, South Sudan. The airline also flies between Entebbe and Kisumu, Kenya.

Fleet
As of December 2012, Royal Daisy Airlines operates the following aircraft
1 Embraer 120  30 seater aircraft

External links
Profile at Centreforaviation.com

See also
 Airlines of Uganda
 List of defunct airlines of Uganda
 List of airports in Uganda

References

Defunct airlines of Uganda
Dairo Air Services
Airlines established in 2005
Companies based in Kampala